Roxanne Benjamin is an American film director, writer, and producer. She is best known for directing the horror films Body at Brighton Rock and There's Something Wrong with the Children and producing the horror anthology films V/H/S and V/H/S/2, She also wrote, produced and directed segments for  Southbound and XX.

Life and career 
Roxanne Benjamin was born and raised in Bradford, Pennsylvania. Benjamin began her filmmaking career by producing V/H/S and its sequel V/H/S/2. Benjamin then wrote and directed segments for Southbound and XX. Benjamin then wrote and directed her feature length directorial debut film Body at Brighton Rock. Benjamin also has directing credits on the television series Creepshow, Riverdale, Chilling Adventures of Sabrina, Nancy Drew, Pretty Little Liars: Original Sin and One of Us Is Lying. Her second feature film There's Something Wrong with the Children was released in 2023.

In March 2019, Benjamin was hired to write the screenplay for the remake of Night of the Comet for Orion Pictures. In July 2021, Benjamin signed on to direct an American remake of the Spanish horror film La cueva titled Fall Into Darkness.

Filmography

Film

Co-producer
 Faults (2014)
 V/H/S: Viral (2014)
 The Devil's Candy (2015)

Short films

Television

References

External links 
 

Year of birth missing (living people)
Living people
American women film directors
American women film producers
21st-century American women writers
Horror film directors